Phadtare (or Fadtare) hail mainly from the Indian state of Maharashtra and states bordering it.

History

In the Peshwa era, some Phadtares  served as commanders in the Huzurat army. They had disputes with Holkars of Indore for prestige in 1751 which was resolved by Chhatrapati and Peshwa. The Phadtare clan served in the Maratha armies in the Middle India wars, Third Battle of Panipat (1761), Battle of Kharda, Anglo-Maratha Wars etc.

References

Maratha clans
Social groups of Maharashtra